The term "National Treasure" has been used in Japan to denote cultural properties since 1897.
The definition and the criteria have changed since the inception of the term. The temple structures in this list were designated national treasures when the Law for the Protection of Cultural Properties was implemented on June 9, 1951. The items are selected by the Ministry of Education, Culture, Sports, Science and Technology based on their "especially high historical or artistic value". This list presents 158 entries of national treasure temple structures from the late 7th-century Classical Asuka period to the early modern 19th-century Edo period. The number of structures listed is more than 158, because in some cases groups of related structures are combined to form a single entry. The structures include main halls such as kon-dō, hon-dō, Butsuden; pagodas, gates, corridors, other halls and structures that are part of a Buddhist temple.

History of Buddhist temples in Japan
Buddhism arrived in Japan in the mid–6th century, and was officially adopted in the wake of the Battle of Shigisan in 587, after which Buddhist temples began to be constructed. Soga no Umako built Hōkō-ji, the first temple in Japan, between 588 and 596. It was later renamed as Asuka-dera for Asuka, the name of the capital where it was located. Prince Shotoku actively promoted Buddhism and ordered the construction of Shitennō-ji in Osaka (593) and Hōryū-ji near his palace in Ikaruga (completed in 603). During the ancient period, the temple layout was strictly prescribed and followed mainland styles, with a main gate facing south, and the most sacred area surrounded by a semi-enclosed roofed corridor (kairō) accessible through a middle gate (chūmon). The sacred precinct contained a pagoda, which acted as a reliquary for sacred objects, and an image hall (kon-dō). The complex might have other structures such as a lecture hall (kōdō), a belfry (shōrō), a sutra repository (kyōzō), priests' and monks'
quarters and bathhouses. The ideal temple had a heart formed by seven structures—called Shichidō garan. Buddhism, and the construction of temples, spread from the capital to outlying areas in the Hakuhō period from 645 to 710. Because of fire, earthquakes, typhoons and wars, few of the ancient temples
remain. Hōryū-ji, rebuilt after a fire in 670, is the only temple with 7th century structures which are the oldest extant wooden
buildings in the world.

Unlike early Shinto shrines, early Buddhist temples were highly ornamental and strictly symmetrical. Starting with the late 7th century Hōryū-ji, temples began to move towards indigenous methods expressed by irregular ground plans that resulted in an asymmetric arrangement of buildings, greater use of natural materials such as cypress bark instead of roof tiling, and an increased awareness of natural environment with the placement of buildings among trees. This adaption was assisted by the syncretism of Shinto and Buddhism.
During the first half of the 8th century, Emperor Shōmu decreed temples and nunneries be erected in each province and that Tōdai-ji be built as a headquarters for the network of temples. Nara period Buddhism was characterised by seven influential state supported temples, the so-called Nanto Shichi Daiji. Octagonal structures such as the Hall of Dreams at Hōryū-ji built as memorial halls and storehouses exemplified by the Shōsōin first appeared during the Nara period. Temple structures, such as pagodas and main halls, had increased significantly in size since the late 6th century. The placement of the pagoda moved to a more peripheral location and the roof bracketing system increased in complexity as roofs grew larger and heavier.

The early Heian period (9th–10th century) saw an evolution of style based on the esoteric sects Tendai and Shingon, which were situated in mountainous areas. A new style termed  emerged with the following characteristics: a main hall divided in two parts; an outer area for novices and an inner area for initiates; a hip-and-gable roof that covered both areas; a raised wooden floor instead of the tile or stone floors of earlier temples; extended eaves to cover the front steps; shingles or bark rather than tile roofing; and an adaption to the natural environment in contrast to symmetrical layouts. The tahōtō, a two-storied tower with a resemblance to Indian stupas was also introduced by these sects during the Heian period. According to an ancient Buddhist prophecy, the world would enter a dark period in 1051. During this period the Tendai sect believed enlightenment was possible only by the veneration of Amida Buddha. Consequently, Paradise or Amida Halls—such as the Phoenix Hall at Byōdō-in (1053), the main hall of
Jōruri-ji (1157) or the Golden Hall at Chūson-ji (1124)—were built by the imperial family or members of the aristocracy to recreate the western paradise of Amida on earth. 
Halls that enshrined the nine statues of Amida were popular during the 12th century in the late Heian period. The main hall of Jōruri-ji is the only extant example of these halls.

The Daibutsu style and the Zen style emerged in the late 12th or early 13th century. The Daibutsu or Great Buddha style, introduced by the priest Chogen, was based on Song dynasty architecture and represented the antithesis of the wayō style. The Nandaimon at Tōdai-ji and the Amida Hall at Jōdo-ji are the only extant examples of this style. Characteristics of the Zen style are earthen floors, subtly curved pent roofs (mokoshi) and pronouncedly curved main roofs, cusped windows and panelled doors. Examples of this style include Butsuden at Kōzan-ji in Shimonoseki, Shakadō at Zenpuku-in and Octagonal Three-storied Pagoda at Anraku-ji. The three Japanese styles, wayō, Daibutsu and Zen were combined in the Muromachi period giving rise to a conglomerate eclectic style represented by the main hall at Kakurin-ji. By the end of the Muromachi period (late 16th century), Japanese Buddhist architecture had reached its apogee. Construction methods had been perfected and building types conventionalized. Early pre-modern temples were saved from monotony by elaborate structural details, the use of undulating karahafu gables and monumental size of the buildings. Representative examples for Momoyama (1568–1603) and Edo period (1603–1868) temple architecture are the Karamon at Hōgon-ji and the main hall of Kiyomizu-dera respectively.

Statistics

Usage
The table's columns (except for Remarks and Image) are sortable pressing the arrows symbols. The following gives an overview of what is included in the table and how the sorting works.
Name: name of the structure as registered in the Database of National Cultural Properties
Temple: name of the temple in which the structure is located
Remarks: architecture and general remarks including
size measured in ken or distance between pillars; "m×n" denotes the length (m) and width (n) of the structure, each measured in ken
architectural style (zukuri) and type of roofing
Date: period and year; the column entries sort by year. If only a period is known, they sort by the start year of that period.
Location: "town-name prefecture-name, geocoordinates of the structure"; the column entries sort as "prefecture-name town-name".
Images: picture of the structure

Treasures

See also
 For an explanation of terms concerning Japanese Buddhism, Japanese Buddhist art, and Japanese Buddhist temple architecture, see the Glossary of Japanese Buddhism.

Notes

General

Architecture

References

Bibliography

Further reading

External links 

Temples
Buddhist temples in Japan
Architecture in Japan
Japan religion-related lists